Crown is an unincorporated community in Logan County, West Virginia, United States.

Crown was so named on account of its lofty elevation. An older name for Crown is Lax or Lax Station.

References

Unincorporated communities in Logan County, West Virginia
Unincorporated communities in West Virginia
Coal towns in West Virginia